Eberbach can refer to:

 Eberbach (Baden), a city on the river Neckar in Baden-Württemberg, Germany
 Eberbach Abbey, a Cistercian monastery in Germany
 Eberbach Pax, a reliquary from Eberbach Abbey
 Eberbach-Seltz, a commune of the Bas-Rhin département in France
 Eberbach (Mergbach), a river of Hesse, Germany, tributary of the Mergbach
 Heinrich Eberbach, World War II German panzer general
 Konrad of Eberbach, (died 1221), Cistercian monk and later abbot of Eberbach Abbey
 Eberbach, the former German name of the Prussian village that is now Gortatowo, Poland